is a Japanese motorcycle racer.

Career statistics

Grand Prix motorcycle racing

By season

By class

Races by year
(key) (Races in bold indicate pole position, races in italics indicate fastest lap)

References

External links

Japanese motorcycle racers
2003 births
Living people
Moto3 World Championship riders
People from Setagaya